IFPE may stand for:

 Instituto Federal de Educação, Ciência e Tecnologia de Pernambuco, a Brazilian institution of higher education in Pernambuco, Brazil
 International Exposition for Power Transmission, a trade show